Banatska Crna Gora (meaning "Black Mountain of Banat") is a historical region between Timișoara and Lugoj in western Romania.

History
"Banatska Crna Gora" is the native Serbian name for the region. Radič, the Serbian magnate, received possessions in Banatska Crna Gora.

Population
The region is inhabited by Eastern Orthodox Serbs (see Serbs in Romania). They speak a dialect of the Serbian language. Pavle Ivić (1924–1999) studied their speech.

See also
Clisura Dunării or "Banatska Klisura"

References

Serb communities in Romania
Geography of Timiș County